College Estate is a suburb of Whanganui, in the Whanganui District and Manawatū-Whanganui region of New Zealand's North Island.

Demographics

There were 474 households. There were 609 males and 675 females, giving a sex ratio of 0.9 males per female. The median age was 39.3 years (compared with 37.4 years nationally), with 264 people (20.6%) aged under 15 years, 267 (20.8%) aged 15 to 29, 489 (38.1%) aged 30 to 64, and 264 (20.6%) aged 65 or older.

Ethnicities were 82.0% European/Pākehā, 19.2% Māori, 2.1% Pacific peoples, 8.6% Asian, and 2.1% other ethnicities (totals add to more than 100% since people could identify with multiple ethnicities).

The proportion of people born overseas was 15.9%, compared with 27.1% nationally.

Although some people objected to giving their religion, 50.0% had no religion, 36.9% were Christian, 0.2% were Hindu, 0.2% were Muslim, 0.9% were Buddhist and 3.5% had other religions.

Of those at least 15 years old, 165 (16.2%) people had a bachelor or higher degree, and 207 (20.3%) people had no formal qualifications. The median income was $23,100, compared with $31,800 nationally. The employment status of those at least 15 was that 372 (36.5%) people were employed full-time, 165 (16.2%) were part-time, and 42 (4.1%) were unemployed.

Education

Public education

Private education

References 

Suburbs of Whanganui